Phytoecia angusta is a species of beetle in the family Cerambycidae. It was described by Per Olof Christopher Aurivillius in 1914, originally under the genus Blepisanis.

References

Phytoecia
Beetles described in 1914